The Diamond Foundation (German: Die Diamantenstiftung) is a 1917 German silent crime film directed by Johannes Guter and starring Ernst Reicher, Marija Leiko and Frida Richard. It was one of a long series of films featuring the detective Stuart Webbs. It premiered at the Marmorhaus in December 1917.

The film's sets were designed by the future director Manfred Noa. It was shot at the Weissensee Studios in Berlin.

Cast
 Ernst Reicher as Stuart Webbs
 Marija Leiko as Gräfin Witkowska 
 Frida Richard 
 Siegmund Aschenbach
 Erwin Botz
 Emil Helfer

References

Bibliography
 Michael Hanisch. Auf den Spuren der Filmgeschichte: Berliner Schauplätze. Henschel, 1991.

External links

1917 films
Films of the German Empire
German silent feature films
Films directed by Johannes Guter
German black-and-white films
1917 crime films
German crime films
1910s German films
Films shot at Weissensee Studios